James Preston Weatherall (October 26, 1929 – August 2, 1992) was an American football defensive tackle in the National Football League (NFL) for the Philadelphia Eagles, Washington Redskins, and the Detroit Lions.  He also played in the Western Interprovincial Football Union (WIFU) for the Edmonton Eskimos.  Weatherall played college football at the University of Oklahoma and was drafted in the second round of the 1952 NFL Draft.  He was inducted into the College Football Hall of Fame in 1992.

Early life
Weatherall grew up in Graham, Texas, and attended White Deer High School in White Deer, Texas.

College career
Weatherall attended and played college football at the University of Oklahoma, where he was consensus All-America in 1950, unanimous All-America in 1951, and won the Outland Trophy in 1951.  He lettered four years at Oklahoma and was the 1951 co-captain.  Weatherall was also a placekicker and kicked 37 extra points in 1950 (fifth in the nation) and 39 in 1951 (second in the nation).  During his college career, Oklahoma had a 39–4 record with a 31-game winning streak and a national championship in 1950.  While at Oklahoma, Weatherall also wrestled.

He was a member of the Naval Reserve Officer Training Corps and graduated with a degree in business administration.

Marines
Weatherall was in the Marines from 1952 to 1954.

Professional career
Weatherall had a nine-year career in which he played in the Western Interprovincial Football Union for the Edmonton Eskimos, and in the National Football League for the Philadelphia Eagles, Washington Redskins, and the Detroit Lions.

After football
After his professional career, Weatherall owned an oil-well servicing company in Oklahoma City, Oklahoma.

Personal life
Weatherall had a wife, Sugar; two sons, Tracy and Clay; a daughter, Jamie; one grandson (born) Randy Clay Weatherall and one  granddaughter Lacey Weatherall Andrews and a nephew.

References

External links
 
 New York Times Obit

1929 births
1992 deaths
All-American college football players
American football defensive tackles
College Football Hall of Fame inductees
Detroit Lions players
Eastern Conference Pro Bowl players
Edmonton Elks players
Oklahoma Sooners football players
People from Young County, Texas
Philadelphia Eagles players
Washington Redskins players
United States Marines